Bashe was a python-like Chinese mythological giant snake that ate elephants.

Name 
The term bashe compounds ba  "a proper name; tip, tail; crust; greatly desire; cling to; be near" and she  "snake; serpent". 

The Chinese character  for ba was graphically simplified from ancient Oracle bone script and Seal script pictograms of a long-tailed snake. In early Written Chinese usage, ba  frequently referred to the Zhou Dynasty (1122 BCE – 256 BCE) state of Ba, which was located in present-day eastern Sichuan. In Modern Standard Chinese usage, ba  often transcribes foreign loanwords such as ba  "bar (unit)", Bali  "Paris", or Guba  "Cuba". Ba  is a variant Chinese character for ba  "grasp; handle", ba  "bamboo; fence", or ba  in bajiao  "banana" (using ba  as the phonetic element with graphic radicals for  "hand",  "bamboo", and  "plant").

Bashe not only names this mythical giant reptile but is also a variant Chinese name for the South Asian ran  or mang  "python" (and South American "boa constrictor" or African "mamba"). "Mythical draconyms often derive from names of larger reptilians", says Carr and "Since pythons usually crush their prey and swallow them whole, one can imagine Chinese tales about southern ran  'pythons' being exaggerated into legendarily-constipated bashe 'giant snakes' that ate an elephant every three years". In literary usage, bashe is found in the four-character idiom bashetunxiang  (lit. "ba-snake gulping down an elephant") meaning "inordinately greedy; extremely insatiable".

Early textual occurrences 
The earliest references to the legendary bashe  are in the Chuci and Shanhaijing, two Chinese classic texts containing Warring States period (475 BCE – 221 BCE) materials compiled during the Han Dynasty (206 BCE – 220 CE). 

The Chuci is an anthology of Chinese poems (see Qu Yuan) from the southern state of Chu and it mentions bashe in the Tianwen  "Heavenly Questions" section. The preeminent Chuci translator David Hawkes describes the Tianwen as a "somewhat odd combination of archaic riddles with questions of a speculative or philosophical nature" and believes "it started as an ancient, priestly riddle-text (a sort of catechism to be used for mnemonic purposes) which was rewritten and greatly enlarged by a secular poet". This mythological questionnaire asks:

The Shanhaijing is an ancient Chinese mytho-geography. Chapter 10, the "Haineinan jing"  "Classic of Regions within the Seas: South" describes a legendary land where bashe lived:

The Shanhaijing commentary by Guo Pu (276–324 CE) compares the ba snake with the southern ran  "python", which after eating a large animal can wind around a tree trunk and expel the bones from between its scales and notes they could grow up to a length of 100 xun  (about 270 meters). Guo's commentary likewise notes this exaggerated length for the changshe  "long snake" that the Shanhaijing locates on Daxian  Mountain "Mount Bigwhole": "There is a snake here named the long-snake; its hair is like pig bristles. It makes a noise like a nightwatchman banging his rattle". 

The 1578 CE Bencao Gangmu entry for ranshe  "python" mentions the bashe: 

Compare how the Shanhaijing description of the ba-snake's sympathetic magic is interpreted as eating the snake (Birrell "take a dose of this snake" and Schiffeler "swallow its flesh") or eating the undigested elephant bones (Read "take these bones as medicine"). This materia medica lists uses for python bile, flesh, fat, teeth, and oil. The Bencao Gangmu says pythons can reach lengths of 50–60 chi  (about 16–20 meters), but Python molurus grow up to 5.8 meters and Python reticulatus 9.2 meters.

The Chinese folklore scholar Wolfram Eberhard links bashe with the legendary archer Houyi  who descended from heaven to destroy evildoers. One of Houyi's victims was a monstrous serpent in Lake Dongting, the xiushe  "adorned/long snake" (or changshe , cf. above). Eberhard concludes giant snakes such as the xiushe, bashe, and ranshe "were typical for the South", but were not part of a snake cult like those among the ancient Baiyue.

See also 
Snakes in Chinese mythology

References

External links 
, ancient Chinese characters for ba

Animals in Chinese mythology
Legendary serpents
Yaoguai